Una Volta (Italian for "one time") is the third album from the band DeVotchKa, released by Cicero Recordings, Ltd. in 2003.

Track listing
 "C'est Ce La" – 1:19
 "The Oblivion" – 5:00
 "Death by Blonde" – 3:34
 "Queen of the Surface Streets" – 5:30
 "One Last Vow" – 4:56
 "Vengo! Vengo!" – 4:54
 "Miette" – 0:41
 "Ocean of Lust"  – 3:35
 "C'est Ce La, Part II" – 3:40
 "Commerce City Sister" – 3:47
 "La Llorona" – 4:51

External links
Band's official site

2003 albums
DeVotchKa albums